A Gran Plan is a 2012 English independent drama film written and directed by Sangeeta Nambiar, and produced by Prema Menon under the banner of Playacting Productions. It features veteran Indian actress Farida Jalal in the lead role.

Plot 
The story of the film revolves around the lives of two individuals — Satvinder Kaur Bedi, a 68-year-old lady, and Oliver, her 10-year-old young boy neighbor. When they meet, they discover that both of them share some common problems regarding loneliness. Soon, they develop a strange but sensitive relationship which gains momentum over the period of time. The ways in which they overcome several hurdles in the form of age, language and culture, and finally communicate with each other to create an intimate long-lasting companionship forms the climax of the story.

Cast 
 Farida Jalal as Satvinder Kaur Bedi
 Oliver Kennett as Oliver
 Malvika Muralidhar as Malvika
 Tania Mukherjee as Pallavi
 Neil Shaabi as Neil
 Pavan J Singh as Hemant
 Pahel Shah as Pooja

Production 
A Gran Plan is produced by Prema Menon under the banner of Playacting Productions, a production house based in Singapore. The film is produced by Sangeeta Nambiar. Executive producers include Kimi Shaabi. Except Farida Jalal (who is based in India), almost all the crew members of A Gran Plan are based in Singapore. The entire film is shot in Singapore.

The theatrical trailer of the film was unveiled on September 15, 2012.

Release 
A Gran Plan was scheduled to release on April 25, 2014 in Singapore, where the production companies and most of the crew members are based.

Festival screenings 
A Gran Plan was screened at the following film festivals in 2012.
 WorldKids International Film Festival
 LA Femme International Film Festival
 The Rome International Film Festival
 Harlem International Film Festival
 Delhi International Film Festival
 The Indie Film Festival (Award of Merit)
 Silent River Film Festival

Accolades 
A Gran Plan was screened at nine film festivals and won the following four awards:

Music 

Music of A Gran Plan has been composed by Kaizad Gherda, Kabir Singh and James Vasanthan. Lyrics are penned by Jaideep Sahni. A promo of the song "Zindagi Sataaegi", sung by renowned singer Shreya Ghoshal, and composed by Kaizad Gherda and Kabir Singh, was released on April 14, 2014.

References

External links 
 

2012 films
2010s English-language films